The Foreign Influence Transparency Scheme Act 2018 (Cth) (FITSA) is an Australian statute that creates a registration scheme for foreign agents in Australia.

FITSA is modelled on the American Foreign Agents Registration Act; when he introduced the bill that would become FITSA in Parliament, then–Prime Minister Malcolm Turnbull described it as an "improved version" of the American statute. The statute was part of a "package" of legislation aimed at countering foreign influence in Australia that the Turnbull government advanced beginning in December 2017. When drafting the bill, the Turnbull government worked closely with the United States Department of Justice. It was amended substantially following criticism from civil society groups that argued the original provisions would stifle freedom of speech.

FITSA received royal assent on 29 June 2018. It requires anyone who engages in lobbying or "any kind of communications activity for the purpose of political influence" on behalf of a "foreign principal"—a term that includes foreign governments and some other organizations—to register with the federal government, and imposes criminal penalties for failure to do so.

Notes

Sources

Further reading

External links 
 Complete text of FITSA

2018 in Australian law
Acts of the Parliament of Australia
Foreign relations of Australia
Foreign intervention